The R252 road is a regional road in Ireland, located in County Donegal. It runs between Fintown and Ballybofey.

References

Regional roads in the Republic of Ireland
Roads in County Donegal